Ralph Monroe Eaton (June 28, 1892April 13, 1932) was an American philosopher of Harvard University whose career was cut short at the age of 39. He specialized in the theory of knowledge and logic but later became interested in psychoanalysis. He served in the United States Army during the First World War and wrote an unpublished memoir of his experiences.

Early life and marriage 
Ralph Monroe Eaton was born on June 28, 1892, in Stockton, California. He was educated at the University of California, Berkeley (Lit. B.A, 1914) and Harvard University (M.A., 1915, Ph.D.,  April 28, 1917). He married Hortense Bissell in 1922, and had a daughter Virginia Eaton Blair, on September 17, 1923.  The marriage was not successful and ended in separation. At age 14, Ralph authored a first-hand account of the San Francisco Earthquake of 1906. The following are excerpts from that account.   "Wednesday, April 18, 1906

This morning I was kind of dozing when the clock struck five and I was still dozing when I felt my bed  shake, I thought someone was shaking me to awaken me at first, but I soon realized that it was an earthquake and a very bad one. I ran into Mama's room and after                               every shock I thought, "this will be the last, "but the shocks continued for fully a minute and a half!  Nothing was damaged here, and we thought no more of it, only as a joke, till about nine o'clock when news began to come from different cities that they were badly damaged, and that San Francisco was in flames.  No authentic news came till this evening  when Papa and I went down to the train to get a S. F, paper.   A Wells Fargo messenger jumped from the train and began describing an actual scene of ruin and death.  “San Francisco is no more," said he. "Not a business is left standing, all the theatres are destroyed, hundreds of people are killed, and thousands injured; the Grand End palace hotels are burned to the ground; all the buildings are being dynamited; and the streets are scattered with dead.  What an awful scene! This calm, serene nature that yesterday smiled so pensively on San Francisco in her prime or growth and beauty, today is dashed to an awful fury and frowns on the ruined buildings gutted by fire, on the flames shooting up in immense tongues toward the heavens.  The loss of life is estimated at about five hundred.  Mama's sister lives in the city and Mama is greatly worried about her.

Sunday, April 29, 1906

This morning Papa and I went to the city (mama backed out the last thing) on the seven-ten train.  The ferry boat was just jammed, there seemed to be as many coming as going.  From the bay, near Alcatraz, the city looks just the same as ever.  There stands the Call Building, the Fairmont, the Chronicle, the Flood, the Crocker, the St, Francis, the Merchants Exchange, and other buildings.  But as you approach near, the flaws in the ferry building, which looks intact from a distance, become perceptible, and the ruins of collapsed docks can be seen!

The huge clock in the tower of the ferry building has stopped at 5:16, the time of the earthquake.  We did not go through the ferry building when we landed but took a safer course and went around.  When you get out there at the foot of Market Street, the full enormity of the calamity comes over you.  Crumbling sections of brick walls, immense pillars, huge arches of buildings, and great forests of tangled steel girders confront the eye.  Further up town, almost all of the fine buildings are standing, and even near the ferry a few stone buildings stand.  Market Street was open, but we were not allowed to drive up Market St., so we went up Mission.  Talk about the ruins of Rome, I do not believe they could compare with the ruins of San Francisco.  We rode up Mission to Seventh, past the Mint, which is intact, and up Golden Gate Avenue behind the City Hall.  The latter is wrecked horribly, all one side of the stone having fallen out and crushed the west end of the building.  The earthquake did this! We got off the bus at Filmore, which is now the main street of San Francisco, and a young fellow with whom we had scraped an acquaintance showed us a church  that had been wrecked by the earthquake, this part of the city having escaped the fire.  The tower had been capped by kind of a dome, perhaps fifteen feet in diameter, supported by a wooden frame.  We then took a lunch which we brought, into a restaurant and sitting down, ordered a cup of coffee.  After that we walked up California Street, out Van Ness, where the fire was checked, past the Spreckels' Mansion, which is completely gutted, up onto Nob Hill.  For blocks and blocks, that originally contained mansions, nothing can be seen but the debris and charred timbers of the beautiful homes.   Uncharred timbers are very scarce.  The only mansion standing, though burned out, is the Crocker home.  We climbed up on the water reservoir and surveyed the city from a point of vantage.  Practically half of San Francisco is burned, and in the district south of Market where wooden buildings prevailed, blocks and blocks have just been swept down by the flames. Out in the streets of Nob Hill, the beds of burned carriages and automobiles are standing.  The Fairmont is not burned badly.  In fact, some of it did not burn at all.  We walked back down town again, past the Flood, the St. Francis, and what is left of the theaters.  In some places in this district the heat has been so terrific that it has warped the railroad tracks into all manner of queer shapes.  In Shrine, the jewelers' new building, the soldiers have pitched a tent.  In the City of Paris dry goods store, although all the wood work of the building is burned, two lace curtains are hanging in a second story window.  Near Union Square, there was a coffin in the middle of the street and a fool of a man deliberately took the lid off and started to get into it.  We walked down Market Street past the Call, Chronicle, and Crocker buildings.  They all seemed to be in pretty good shape considering what they have gone through.  On the upper stories of these and other buildings huge slabs of the stone have been split off by the heat.  On Market Street near the ferry the paving has sunk about three feet, but I did not see any fissures. We took the four o'clock train home and I am hoping to dearly rest.

World War I 
In the late spring of 1917, Eaton volunteered for [perhaps after a draft notice], and was accepted to the U.S. Army Officers' Training Corps.  He trained in Plattsburgh, New York in the summer of 1917. Upon completion of basic training, he was commissioned a Second Lieutenant. In the fall of 1917, he shipped out to France via Halifax, Nova Scotia, with the 26th "Yankee" Division , 103rd Infantry Regiment. His description of heading out of Halifax follows:"I am setting off for the war. A line of ships, grey with wide zigzag stripes painted in black and white across their hulls, decks, and funnels; moves in the sunshine of a September afternoon, down the harbor at Halifax. Three British warships flank the channel on either side. On their desks the sailors stand at attention as our ships, British ships bearing green Americans to France, pass out to sea. Bands are playing, flags flying, and under my lieutenant’s uniform little pimples of gooseflesh stand out all over my skin."He initially served as a supply officer with the 26th Division,  and but later transferred to the infantry. He was given a battlefield promotion to the rank of First Lieutenant on September 13, 1918. His division and regiment saw action at Chateau Thierry, at Belleau Woods,  Saint-Mihiel, and in the Argonne.

After the war, he wrote an unpublished memoir of his experiences, "Backward glances of a demobilized soldier" - a small portion of which were published by the Washington Post, on Nov. 11, 2001 - https://www.washingtonpost.com/archive/opinions/2001/11/11/called-upon-to-have-courage/a5b52116-dcbb-43ab-97a7-6da62b06c4fc/  In Backward Glances, he wrote:

" On April 7, 1917 the United States of America, the eagle with outstretched wings, in awful posture, rose up before each of us and claimed him for his own.  I knew before of the existence of social might; I had seen it appear in the income-tax collector and the policeman at the corner, but it had left me to pursue my individual destiny.  Some men revolt against social might and suffer ignominiously or nobly for a vision. I did not revolt, as soon revolt against the wind or the thunderstorm.  One is of his age and goes to war if war comes in it. He gains thereby the right to do the bidding of an impersonal and immense organism, the Army, which is the tool of a mightier and more impersonal organism - his country.

Mr. Bernard Shaw remarks, in the preface to Heartbreak House, that it is much more difficult to live than to die courageously.  Dying is the affair of the moment, and it may be hard to contemplate, it is not so hard to encounter.  Living goes on and on, tangling us in its complexities, offering us its insignificant choices, which turn out to make significant differences, challenging us more often with small than great trials, annoying us with its "tremendous trifles".  It is not, like death, swift and inevitable, and by these very qualities, easier to meet than that which need not have been.  There is always the other turning, always the tortuous subtlety of choices, the personal responsibility and guilt, attendant upon the free sense of being the master of one's own destiny.  We who were soldiers came from a simplified world, in which duties and responsibilities, choices and actions, were clearly marked, and in which there were no other turnings, nor any might-have-beens.  Having chosen to go to war, the path for us lay straight ahead, carefully defined by general and special orders, through training camp to France and the trenches, and if chance brought it, to swift and inevitable death.  Having given ourselves, we belonged body and soul to the Army, to be used as it saw fit; to be regulated in the most intimate details of our lives, as well as in the greater matter of how and when we were to give them up.  We slept, ate, rested, toiled under orders- under orders we wrote to our sweethearts, changed our shirts, and washed our bodies.  "By direction of the Commanding Officer," became the phrase which summed up our law and conscience.

           It is not strange that the soldier, coming from a life so beautifully simple, in which he was asked only to grit his teeth and do his duty, should like Plato's philosopher loosed from the cave, be somewhat dazzled by the sunlight of freedom. The human will find its way with difficulty, and with little assurance of what it mentally needs or wants; and is never free from the risk of going astray in the joy of taking its own road. So, if in some respects it is a hard lot to be a soldier, in this respect, that thinking, and planning are not personally necessary, it is infinitely easier than to be a civilian. One may resent being caustically advised that he must have a haircut, or a shave, or being ordered out at an unspeakable hour of the night from a cozy French straw pile, to make ten kilometers under full pack before dawn- but he can shave or make his ten kilometers with a free and satisfied heart, in full consciousness of having discharged his duty towards God and his neighbor.  There is a kind of supreme moral repose in finding that, once enlisted in a great undertaking so worthwhile as defeating the Boches, the smallest actions became a regulated part of a gigantic social mechanism, which rolls on and on, carrying one without the effort of volition, toward achievement.

But the soldier is not content with repose, even moral repose; and he welcomes back his freedom, home and civvies, and the right to go and come as he pleases, without taps to put him to bed and reveille to get him up in a spirit of thankfulness.  He watches Brest slip away in the fog behind the headlands with exaltation in his soul, because he is coming that much nearer to the end of rules and regulations and directions of the Commanding Officer.  And yet when France did pass into memory several months ago, it was not hard to foresee that the soldier's heart was destined to soften toward the Army, and his exultation to change with time, to longing; for life in France was after all more than rules and regulations.  There was a sweep and scope in its simplicity which somehow, made it not bad.  Perhaps memory is playing tricks with imagination and covering it over with a romance which it did not have.  At any rate it is difficult to forget.  Mr. Shaw may be right.  There may be nothing in the war worth remembering except its stupidity, its bitterness, and its blood; and everyday living may take a finer kind of courage than dying under orders.  But strangely enough, it is sometimes hard for the demobilized soldier at least for one demobilized soldier - not to wish himself back on a French highroad at night, marching beneath the stars toward the distant thunder and light of the guns."

He further described the "romance in modern warfare ... a saga of vaster proportions than ever before; a tremendous drama of men and mechanisms" but also of his first experience of death in war when his sergeant " lay like a beautiful slaughtered animal, this boy whom I had loved and had beside me, his gashed and bloody head supported in the trembling arms of a comrade. He opened pained eyes and spoke my name, as I felt his shivering body for the more fatal wound which I knew he must have in the chest. And then, when he had been lifted to a stretcher, after they had carried him away to the dressing station, I went into my abri [bunker] and wept as I have not wept before or since. A day later we buried him at Vaucresson."

Lt. Ralph M. Eaton was in the trenches when the guns fell silent.  He wrote: "There is a kind of theatricality and bombast about military life which often forms the whole of it in imagination but which disappears in action. One never sees a flag or hears a bugle; imagery and symbolism are replaced by weary limbs and sleepless eyes. On Nov. 11, 1918, for the first time at the front, I saw a flag. The guns had ceased to speak after a long morning of mutual recrimination; we could not believe that they were at last still. Then the ambulances and camions began to rattle up from Verdun, on each the Tricolor and the Stars and Stripes and we knew by that sign that the end had come."

Academic career 
Eaton obtained his undergraduate degree the University of California, Berkeley (Lit. B.A, 1914), and his first graduate degree at Harvard University (M.A., 1915). Eaton continued his studies as a Ph.D. candidate in philosophy at Harvard University from 1915 to 1917.  He earned his Ph.D. April 28 of 1917. After enlisting in the Army and serving in France, he demobilized at Camp Devens, MA, in 1919.  He returned to Harvard as an Assistant Professor in 1919 and later as an Associate Professor in February 1930. He stayed at the university until the end of his career.  He was also briefly an assistant professor at Radcliffe College.

He was a Guggenheim Fellow in 1926, awarded for a study of the "philosophy, particularly the theory of knowledge in its relation to logic and metaphysics, with Professor E. Husserl and the phenomenological school of German philosophers, principally at the University of Freiburg, Germany; and for the writing in English of a critical account of the philosophy of this school".  At Harvard, he worked with and was a good friend of professor Alfred North Whitehead.

Eaton's first interests were in the scientific method and logic and his first book, Symbolism and Truth (1925), was an epistemological study that used logic to explore philosophy. It was compared to Wittgenstein's Tractatus in its preoccupations. In General Logic (1931), Eaton dealt with symbolic logic as well as the Aristotelian idea of logic and inductive logic. On the basis of the works, Harvard promoted Eaton to associate professor in February 1930.  Soon afterwards he was found in his room drunk and depressed over the failure of his marriage.  As a result, in March the university withdrew his promotion, declared him emotionally unstable, and put him on leave until the start of the 1931–32 academic year. In addition, his contract as an assistant professor was not renewed at the end of that academic year. He became interested in psychoanalysis and the break from his Harvard duties allowed him to translate and write a preface to Secret Ways of the Mind by Wolfgang Müller Kranefeldt, with an introduction by Carl Jung, which was published in early 1932. During this time he worked closely with Jung, spending time with him in Zurich, and allowing Jung to interpret his dreams. It is possible that Eaton may have suffered from Post Traumatic Stress Disorder (PTSD) after his experience in the trenches of World War I.

Death
In April 1932, Eaton dismissed a class at Radcliffe due to dizziness. At the insistence of friends, he checked into a hospital for a night, but departed the next morning. A group of colleagues found his body in a forest in West Concord, where he had taken his life.

Selected publications  
Symbolism and truth: An introduction to the theory of knowledge. Harvard University Press, Cambridge, MA, 1925.
Selections from Descartes. Scribner's, 1927. (editor) (The Modern Student's Library)
General logic: An Introductory Survey. Scribner's, 1931.

"The Social Unrest of the Soldier," Author(s): Ralph M. Eaton. Reviewed work(s):Source: International Journal of Ethics, Vol. 31, No. 3 (Apr., 1921), pp. 279–288Published by: The University of Chicago PressStable URL: http://www.jstor.org/stable/2377581

"Eaton on the Problem of Negation," Jonathan D, Moreno, George Washington University, Ebsco Publishing, 2003.

"Social Fatalism," Author(s): Ralph M. Eaton. Source: The Philosophical Review, Vol. 30, No. 4 (Jul., 1921), pp. 380–392 Duke University Press, Stable URL: http://www.jstor.org/stable/2179048

"The Logic of Probable Propositions,"Author(s): Ralph M. Eaton. Source: The Journal of Philosophy, Psychology and Scientific Methods, Vol. 17, No. 2 (Jan.15, 1920), pp. 44-51Published by: Journal of Philosophy, Inc.Stable URL: http://www.jstor.org/stable/2939997

"The Meaning of Chance," Author(s): Ralph M. Eaton. Source: The Monist, Vol. 31, No. 2 (APRIL, 1921), pp. 280–296Published by: Hegeler InstituteStable URL: http://www.jstor.org/stable/27900856 .

"The Value of Theories,"Author(s): Ralph M. Eaton. Source: The Journal of Philosophy, Vol. 18, No. 25 (Dec. 8, 1921), pp. 682-690Published by: Journal of Philosophy, Inc.Stable URL: http://www.jstor.org/stable/2939740 .

"What is the Problem of Knowledge?" Author(s): Ralph M. Eaton. Source: The Journal of Philosophy, Vol. 20, No. 7 (Mar. 29, 1923), pp. 178–187Published by: Journal of Philosophy, Inc.Stable URL: http://www.jstor.org/stable/2939834

See also 
Raphael Demos
Alfred North Whitehead
"The Motives of the Soldier," Author(s): T. H. Procter. Reviewed work(s):Source: International Journal of Ethics, Vol. 31, No. 1 (Oct., 1920), pp. 26–50Published by: The University of Chicago Press Stable URL: http://www.jstor.org/stable/2377162

References 

1892 births
1932 suicides
Harvard University faculty
People from Stockton, California
University of California, Berkeley alumni
Harvard University alumni
Radcliffe College faculty
United States Army officers
United States Army personnel of World War I
Military personnel from California
Suicides in Massachusetts
Suicides by sharp instrument in the United States
20th-century American philosophers